J. S. and Melinda Waggener Farmstead is a farm located in Cornelius, Washington County, Oregon.  It is listed on the National Register of Historic Places in 2003.

References

National Register of Historic Places in Washington County, Oregon
Houses in Washington County, Oregon
Houses on the National Register of Historic Places in Oregon
1940 establishments in Oregon
Houses completed in 1940
Barns on the National Register of Historic Places in Oregon